Karl Marx Peak rises to  in the Shakhdara Range in Pamir Mountains, in the south-west of Tajikistan's Gorno-Badakhshan Autonomous Province (eastern part of Ishkoshim district), just north of the Panj River and the Afghanistan border. It was named after the German philosopher Karl Marx whose theories were the basis of communism and socialism. The highest summit in the Shakhdara Range, it was discovered and named in 1937 by Soviet geologist and explorer of South-West Pamir Sergey Klunnikov. The ascent was delayed by the outbreak of World War II, and Karl Marx Peak was first climbed in 1946 by a group of Soviet alpinists led by Evgeniy Beletskiy.

References

External links
 

Mountains of Tajikistan
Gorno-Badakhshan Autonomous Region
Six-thousanders of the Pamir